Dying God (also known as Final Spawn) is a 2008 Argentinian–French horror-science fiction film directed by Fabrice Lambot and produced by Jean Pierre Putters of Metaluna Productions France and Uriel Barros of Buenos Aires Rojo Shocking (Argentina)

Plot 
Sean Fallon, a corrupt cop, attempts to solve a series of unexplainable rapes that have resulted in the brutal deaths of prostitutes. Fallon discovers that the rapes are the work of a creature worshiped as a god by South American tribes. Aided by a local pimp, Fallon attempts to stop the creature while dealing with his own issues.

Cast

Release
Green Apple released Dying God on DVD on December 10, 2010.

Reception
Scott Foy of Dread Central rated it 1.5/5 stars and called it "a cheap, dull, ugly-looking movie with ugly characters and a monster that remains uninspired despite the unsavory nature of this beast."  Adam Arseneau of DVD Verdict criticized the film's premise and execution as being of poor quality. Adrian Halen of HorrorNews.net noted that the film had the look and feel of SyFy Channel original movie, with poor execution, and generic story.

References

External links
 
 

2008 films
2008 horror films
English-language Argentine films
English-language French films
Argentine horror films
French science fiction horror films
Argentine independent films
French independent films
2000s science fiction horror films
2008 independent films
2000s English-language films
2000s French films
2000s Argentine films